is an administrative unit in Japan, often referred to in English as town. In Japanese and other languages, it may also refer to:

Places
Machi, Iran, a village in Hormozgan Province, Iran
Maji, Ethiopia, a city in southwestern Ethiopia
Machi, Manipur, India
Machi, Mardan, Pakistan

Mythology and religious tradition

Machi (biblical figure), a minor Biblical figure appearing in Numbers 13:15
Machi (shaman), the shaman of the Mapuche indigenous culture

Popular culture

Machi (hip hop group), a Taiwanese hip-hop group
Machi Esports, a professional multi-gaming organization founded by the hip hop group
Machi (Hunter × Hunter), a character from the manga series Hunter × Hunter
Machi (video game), a 1998 video game
"Machi", a song by Borgeous and Ryos
Machi (film), a 2004 Tamil action film

Other uses
Machi (name), a given name and surname (including a list of people with the name)
Machiyar, also known as Machi, a Muslim community in Gujarat, India
Machi Koro, a Japanese tabletop city-building game

See also

Malachi
 Mach 1 (disambiguation) (including Mach-I)